Ulgar Dupart was a delegate at Louisiana's 1868 constitutional convention for Terrebonne Parish and a state legislator. He served in the Louisiana House of Representatives from 1868 to 1870. He advocated for equal rights. He was a Republican. He represented the Parish alongside Frederick Marie, an immigrant from France.

See also
African-American officeholders during and following the Reconstruction era

References

19th-century American politicians
African-American state legislators in Louisiana
Republican Party members of the Louisiana House of Representatives
Year of birth missing
Year of death missing